The 1984–85 NHL season was the 68th season of the National Hockey League. The Edmonton Oilers won their second straight Stanley Cup by beating the Philadelphia Flyers four games to one in the final series.

League business
This was the first year since they began broadcasting that CBC was not the lone network broadcaster in Canada.  While Molson continued to present Hockey Night in Canada on Saturday nights, rival brewery Carling O'Keefe began airing Friday night games on CTV.  The two networks split the playoffs and finals.

Referee Andy Van Hellemond becomes the first on ice official in league history to wear a helmet. Soon, several officials would follow his lead and wear helmets before it became mandatory for all officials for the 2006–07 season.

Regular season
The Philadelphia Flyers had the best record in the NHL, four points ahead of second place Edmonton Oilers. Flyers goaltender Pelle Lindbergh went on to become the first European to win the Vezina Trophy. Oilers' star Wayne Gretzky once again won the Art Ross Trophy by reaching the 200 plateau for the third time in four years. He also set a new record for assists in a season with 135 and won his sixth straight Hart Memorial Trophy. Mario Lemieux made his NHL debut by scoring 100 points and winning the Calder Trophy for rookie of the year. On October 26, 1984, Paul Coffey of the Edmonton Oilers would be the last defenceman in the 20th century to score four goals in one game. It occurred in a game versus the Detroit Red Wings.

The last two players active in the 1960s, Butch Goring and Brad Park, retired after the playoffs. Goring was the last active, playing his last playoff game three days after Park's last game.

Final standings
Note: W = Wins, L = Losses, T = Ties, GF= Goals For, GA = Goals Against, Pts = Points, PIM = Penalties in minutes. Teams qualifying for the playoffs shown in bold.

Prince of Wales Conference

Clarence Campbell Conference

Playoffs

The defending champion Edmonton Oilers returned to the Final, meeting the overall regular season champion Philadelphia Flyers. In the Final, Edmonton would lose the first game to the Flyers but would then take the next four to win their second consecutive Stanley Cup.

For the second consecutive and last season, the finals used the 2–3–2 home ice format.

Playoff bracket

Stanley Cup Finals

Awards

Hart Memorial Trophy voting

James Norris Memorial Trophy voting

Jack Adams Award voting

Vezina Trophy voting

All-Star teams

Player statistics

Scoring leaders
Note: GP = Games played; G = Goals; A = Assists; Pts = Points

Source: NHL.

Leading goaltenders
Note: GP = Games played; W = Won; L = Lost; T = Tied; GA = Goals allowed; GAA = Goals against average; SO = Shutouts

Coaches

Patrick Division
New Jersey Devils: Doug Carpenter
New York Islanders: Al Arbour
New York Rangers: Herb Brooks and Craig Patrick
Philadelphia Flyers: Mike Keenan
Pittsburgh Penguins: Bob Berry
Washington Capitals: Bryan Murray

Adams Division
Boston Bruins: Gerry Cheevers and Harry Sinden
Buffalo Sabres: Scotty Bowman
Hartford Whalers: Jack Evans
Montreal Canadiens: Jacques Lemaire
Quebec Nordiques: Michel Bergeron

Norris Division
Chicago Black Hawks: Orval Tessier and Bob Pulford
Detroit Red Wings: Nick Polano
Minnesota North Stars: Glen Sonmor
St. Louis Blues: Jacques Demers
Toronto Maple Leafs: Dan Maloney

Smythe Division
Calgary Flames: Bob Johnson
Edmonton Oilers: Glen Sather
Los Angeles Kings: Pat Quinn
Vancouver Canucks: Bill LaForge and Harry Neale 
Winnipeg Jets: Barry Long

Milestones

Debuts
The following is a list of players of note who played their first NHL game in 1984–85 (listed with their first team, asterisk(*) marks debut in playoffs):
Gino Cavallini, Calgary Flames
Joel Otto, Calgary Flames
Ed Olczyk, Chicago Black Hawks
Marc Bergevin, Chicago Black Hawks
Gerard Gallant, Detroit Red Wings
Esa Tikkanen*, Edmonton Oilers
Steve Smith, Edmonton Oilers
Kevin Dineen, Hartford Whalers
Ray Ferraro, Hartford Whalers
Sylvain Cote, Hartford Whalers
Ulf Samuelsson, Hartford Whalers
Garry Galley, Los Angeles Kings
Patrick Roy, Montreal Canadiens
Petr Svoboda, Montreal Canadiens
Stephane Richer, Montreal Canadiens
Greg Adams, New Jersey Devils
Kirk Muller, New Jersey Devils
Dave Gagner, New York Rangers
Grant Ledyard, New York Rangers
Kelly Miller, New York Rangers
Tomas Sandstrom, New York Rangers
Rick Tocchet, Philadelphia Flyers
Doug Bodger, Pittsburgh Penguins
Mario Lemieux, Pittsburgh Penguins
Steve Thomas, Toronto Maple Leafs
Todd Gill, Toronto Maple Leafs
Al Iafrate, Toronto Maple Leafs
Petri Skriko, Vancouver Canucks
Kevin Hatcher, Washington Capitals
Dave Ellett, Winnipeg Jets

Last games
The following is a list of players of note that played their last game in the NHL in 1984–85 (listed with their last team):
 Terry O'Reilly, Boston Bruins
 Butch Goring, Boston Bruins
 Craig Ramsay, Buffalo Sabres
 Jerry Korab, Buffalo Sabres
 Jim Schoenfeld, Buffalo Sabres
 Real Cloutier, Buffalo Sabres
 Bob MacMillan, Chicago Black Hawks
 Brad Park, Detroit Red Wings
 Colin Campbell, Detroit Red Wings
 Darryl Sittler, Detroit Red Wings
 Ivan Boldirev, Detroit Red Wings
 Steve Shutt, Los Angeles Kings
 Paul Holmgren, Minnesota North Stars
 Pierre Mondou, Montreal Canadiens 
 Anders Hedberg, New York Rangers
 Robbie Ftorek, New York Rangers
 Rick Kehoe, Pittsburgh Penguins
 John Garrett, Vancouver Canucks

Note: Goring and Park were the last two players to have played in the NHL in the 1960s.

See also
 List of Stanley Cup champions
 1984 NHL Entry Draft
 1984–85 NHL transactions
 37th National Hockey League All-Star Game
 National Hockey League All-Star Game
 NHL All-Rookie Team
 1984 Canada Cup
 1984 in sports
 1985 in sports

References
 
 
 
 
Notes

External links
Hockey Database
NHL.com
Oiler playoff highlights
 

 
1
1